Khwaji Khel is a tribe or clan in jurisdiction of Tank District.

Origin
Khwaji Khel is a sub-tribe of Malay zai or Mali zai, better known as the Mullazai tribe.

History
Khwaji Khels are the descendants of Malay zai probably known as Mullazai.

References

http://www.khyber.org/
http://www.thenews.com.pk/daily_detail.asp?id=192140

Tank District